Judit Takács (born 1968) is a Hungarian sociologist, researcher and university professor. She is a Research Chair of the Hungarian Academy of Sciences and works at the Institute of Sociology of the Centre for Social Sciences. 

Her main research interests are family roles, work–life balance, social history of sexual minorities, transphobia, homophobia, discrimination, equality, HIV/AIDS prevention.

Education 
Takács was born in Budapest, Hungary. Her parents were both intellectuals; her mother was a linguist, her father was an ethnographer. She studied history and Hungarian language and literature (MA degree 1992) and cultural anthropology (MA degree 1995) at Eotvos Lorand University of Budapest. She also got an MA in Social Sciences (1994) from University of Amsterdam.

Takács has a PhD degree in sociology from Corvinus University, she got her habilitation in 2011 from Eotvos Lorand University.

Publications

In Hungarian 
 
 Neményi Mária – Takács Judit (2015) Örökbefogadás és diszkrimináció Magyarországon. 
 Takács J - Mocsonaki László - P. Tóth Tamás (2008) 
 Takács J (2004) Homoszexualitás és társadalom.

In English 
 Takács J (2017) Listing Homosexuals since the 1920s and under State Socialism in Hungary. 157-170. In Catherine Baker (ed.) 
 Szalma Ivett; Takács J (2017) How to measure fathering practices in a European comparison? 228-249. In Michael J. Breen (ed.) 
 Takács J; Szalma Ivett; Bartus Tamás (2016) Social Attitudes toward Adoption by Same-Sex Couples in Europe. 
 Szalma Ivett – Takács J (2015) Who Remains Childless? Unrealized Fertility Plans in Hungary. 
 
 Takács J (2015) Disciplining gender and (homo)sexuality in state socialist Hungary in the 1970s. In:

References

External links 
List of Publications at www.policy.hu.
List of publications at academia.edu.

1968 births
Living people
Hungarian sociologists
Hungarian women sociologists
Members of the Hungarian Academy of Sciences